USS Siwash (SP-12) was an armed motorboat that served in the United States Navy as a patrol vessel from 1917 to 1919.

Siwash was built in 1916 by the Gas Engine and Power Company at Morris Heights, New York, as a private motorboat of the same name. The U.S. Navy acquired her from her owner, C. A. Schieren of New York City, on 18 June 1917 for World War I service. She was commissioned as USS Siwash (SP-12) on 18 August 1917.

Siwash patrolled in the 3rd Naval District in the New York City area until decommissioned on 10 May 1919. She was transferred to the United States Department of Commerce on 16 June 1919.

Notes

References

Department of the Navy: Naval Historical Center: Online Library of Selected Images: Civilian Ships: Siwash (Motor Boat, 1916). Served as USS Siwash (SP-12) in 1917-1919
NavSource Online: Section Patrol Craft Photo Archive Siwash (SP 12)

Patrol vessels of the United States Navy
World War I patrol vessels of the United States
Ships built in Morris Heights, Bronx
1916 ships